The Atlantic City CardSharks were a professional indoor football team based in Atlantic City, New Jersey. They were members of the Eastern Division of the Atlantic Conference of the National Indoor Football League (NIFL) during the 2004 season. The team played its home games at Boardwalk Hall.

Coached by former Oakland Raider Mike Siani, the CardSharks won their first ever game on April 10, 2004, with a 77-37 victory over the Greenville Riverhawks. The CardSharks finished the regular season with 9-5 record, finishing in second place in the Eastern Division, earning a playoff spot. The CardSharks lost in the first round of the 2004 NIFL Playoffs to the Lexington Horsemen (final score: 45-25). The team folded after only playing one season in 2004.

Coaches of note

Head coaches
Note: Statistics are correct through the end of the 2012 CIFL season.

Statistics and records

Season-by-season results
Note: The Finish, Wins, Losses, and Ties columns list regular season results and exclude any postseason play.

References

External links
Atlantic City Cardsharks Website

National Indoor Football League teams
Defunct American football teams in New Jersey
Sports in Atlantic City, New Jersey
2003 establishments in New Jersey
2004 disestablishments in New Jersey
American football teams established in 2003
American football teams disestablished in 2004